The Deltarhine region is a river basin district of the Rhine basin, and consists of the Dinkel, the Berkel, and the Oude IJssel regional river basins. It covers 11,000 square kilometres and straddles the German-Dutch border, with 65% in the Netherlands and 35% in Germany.

It is covered by an international water management regime between the two countries, the Deltarhine regime.

Designation
The Water Framework Directive, or Directive 2000/60/EC is a European Union directive intended to enable the sustainable management of inland water resources. Under the directive, member states are instructed to determine individual river basins, along with their aquifers, transitional waters, and coastal waters, and assign them to one or more river basin districts. Small river basins, such as those in Cornwall, might be grouped together in a single district, while large basins might be split into multiple.

The Rhine basin is one of the later; in order to properly manage its 185,000 square kilometres covering ten countries, it has been split into nine river basin districts, of which the Deltarhine is the furthest downstream.

Deltarhine Regime
The region is managed by an international water management regime between the Netherlands and Germany, the Detlarhine regime. While the regime has only formally existed since 2000, cooperation started decades prior, in the 1960's, primarily at a regional level. This cooperation has seen minimal results; a 2014 study found that almost all respondents agreed that the effect of the regime, in terms of water management practice and domestic policies, was marginal, although there were benefits in terms of communication and knowledge transfer.

Reference section

Sources

 
 
 
 

Rhine basin
Drainage basins of Germany
Drainage basins of the Netherlands
IJssel basin
Tributaries of the Rhine